2/2  may refer to:

2nd Battalion, 2nd Marines, a light infantry battalion in the United States Marine Corps
, a time signature in music
February 2, a date

See also
2+2 (disambiguation)
Two two (disambiguation)
2/2nd Anti-Tank Regiment (Australia)
2/2nd Machine Gun Battalion (Australia)